The second season of Man v. Food, an American food reality television series hosted by Adam Richman on the Travel Channel, premiered on August 5, 2009. First-run episodes of the series aired in the United States on the Travel Channel on Wednesdays at 10:00 PM Eastern time. Man v. Food was executive produced by Matt Sharp, in association with the Travel Channel. The season contained 20 episodes and finished airing on December 16, 2009. On February 3, 2010, a special "Live" episode aired.

Man v. Food is hosted by actor and food enthusiast Adam Richman. In each episode, Richman explores the "big food" of a different American city before facing off against a pre-existing eating challenge at a local restaurant. Not counting the "Live" episode in Miami (which he won), the final second season tally was: 13 wins for "Man" and 7 wins for "Food".

Production
The second season was first rumored in March 2009 when the Anchorage Daily News said that people from the show had contacted the owners of the Pepper Mill, home to "Fat Andy's Pizza Challenge". This challenge, still unmet after two years and 50 attempts, requires two people to eat a  two-meat, two-cheese pizza in one hour or less. A successful challenger would win $500 in cash and have their photo posted on "Fat Andy's Wall of Pain". The challenge pizza, the equivalent of four standard large pizzas, costs $49.99 and requires a full half-hour to bake. Although Anchorage was visited this season, the "Fat Andy's Pizza Challenge", however, was not aired.

As for filming dates, shortly after season one finished airing, Richman told an interviewer: "They [Travel Channel] want to start up again in May. It doesn't leave a lot of time for me". Season 2 started filming in Sarasota, Florida, on May 2, 2009.

Reception
Joe Killian, culture critic for the Greensboro News-Record, wrote: "Caught the second-season premiere of Man v. Food last night and I've got to say, I think I'm hooked". Christopher Lawrence of the Las Vegas Review-Journal described Richman as "impressive" and "likable" saying "think a beefier Fred Savage, although one who somehow weighs less than he did last season". On his mastery of the spicy sushi roll challenge in Charleston, South Carolina, Katie Koch of the Charleston City Paper said: "This is a feat only an insane or highly admirable person could accomplish". After detailing Richman's ice cream challenge in the San Francisco episode, Joshua Gillin of the St. Petersburg Times noted humorously: "He is definitely one person who will be dropped by his health insurance".  Jonathan Bernstein of British newspaper The Guardian described "mixed feelings" about the series saying he likes "the concept" and "the guy" but that the challenges make him "a little uneasy". Emley Kerry of Tiger Weekly wondered, "Why isn't he fatter? Or just dead?"

Episodes

Man v. Food Live

References

External links
Man v. Food official website
YouTube Link to Part of San Antonio Episode 1 (ten minutes)
La Moon Restaurant official website

2009 American television seasons
2010 American television seasons
Man v. Food